is an English trusts law case, concerning breach of trust and liability for dishonest assistance.

Facts
Royal Brunei Airlines appointed Borneo Leisure Travel Sdn Bhd to be its agent for booking passenger flights and cargo transport around Sabah and Sarawak. Mr Tan was Borneo Leisure Travel's managing director and main shareholder. It was receiving money for Royal Brunei, which was agreed to be held on trust in a separate account until passed over. But Borneo Leisure Travel, with Mr Tan's knowledge and assistance, paid money into its current account and used it for its own business. Borneo Leisure travel failed to pay on time, the contract was terminated, and it went insolvent. Royal Brunei claimed the money back from Mr Tan.

The Judge held Mr Tan was liable as a constructive trustee to Royal Brunei. The Court of Appeal of Brunei Darussalam held that the company was not guilty of fraud or dishonesty, and so Mr Tan could not be either. The case was appealed to the Privy Council, where the Privy Council found in favour of the claimant, reversing the decision of the Court of Appeal.

Advice
Giving the advice of the Privy Council, Lord Nicholls held it was the dishonest assistant's state of mind which matters. Knowledge depends on a ‘gradually darkening spectrum’. Therefore, the test for being liable in assisting breach of trust must depend on dishonesty, which is objective. It is irrelevant what the primary trustee's state of mind is, if the assistant is himself dishonest.

Lord Goff, Lord Ackner, Lord Steyn and Sir John May concurred.

See also

English trusts law
Lumley v Gye [1853] EWHC QB J73

Notes

External links
 Case at bailii.org

English trusts case law
Judicial Committee of the Privy Council cases on appeal from Brunei
1995 in Brunei
1995 in case law
Royal Brunei Airlines